Districts are second-level administrative divisions of Madagascar below the regions. There are 114 districts in Madagascar. Districts are in their turn divided into communes; while some of the districts in urban areas (such as the City districts of Antananarivo, Antsirabe I, Antsiranana I, Fianarantsoa I, Toamasina I and Toliara I) and offshore islands (such as the districts of Nosy Be and Nosy Boraha) each consist of only one commune, most of the districts are divided typically into 5–20 communes.

List of districts 

 Note that Isandra, Lalangina and Vohibato Districts previously formed Fianarantsoa II District (within Haute Matsiatra Region) which has now been split into these three new districts. Another new district was formed by the splitting off of the new Mandoto District from Betafo District (within Vakinankaratra Region).

See also 
 Subdivisions of Madagascar
 Provinces of Madagascar
 Regions of Madagascar
 List of cities in Madagascar

References 

 
Subdivisions of Madagascar
Madagascar, Districts
Madagascar 2
Districts, Madagascar
Madagascar geography-related lists